Toothill Fort, or Toothill Ring, or Toothill camp, is the site of an Iron Age univallate hill fort located in Hampshire. The site occupies an extremely strong position at the north end of a spur. Its defences comprise a single rampart and ditch with traces of a counterscarp bank in places. There is an additional scarp on the north side up to 2.0m in height where the site is weakest. The original entrance is onto the ridge to the south.

The name "Toot hill" literally means lookout hill (similar to "Tout" in Dorset). The site is very heavily wooded. The redwoods planted in the middle of the hill fort make the hill even more of a landmark for many miles around.

Location
The M27 motorway passes close by to the south of the site. The hill has a summit of 84m AOD.

References

See also 
List of places in Hampshire
List of hill forts in England
List of hill forts in Scotland
List of hill forts in Wales



Iron Age sites in England
Buildings and structures in Hampshire
Hill forts in Hampshire
Archaeological sites in Hampshire